The Preston Bypass was the United Kingdom’s first motorway.  It was designed and engineered by Lancashire County Council surveyor James Drake as part of a larger initiative to create a north-south motorway network that would later form part of the M6 motorway. The bypass was opened on 5 December 1958 by the then Prime Minister, Harold Macmillan.  Nearly £3 million was spent in its construction. The original -mile motorway ran around the east side of Preston between Bamber Bridge (now the M6, Junction 29) and Broughton (now the M55, Junction 1) and crosses over the River Ribble at Samlesbury at the M6 Junction 31.

Planning started in 1937, despite there being no legal powers that permitted motorway construction until the introduction of the Special Roads Act 1949. Early work was hampered by heavy rainfall, resulting in postponement of various heavy engineering works such as the base foundation; the result of the weather meant the original two-year plan was delayed by a further five months. Weeks after opening, the road had to close temporarily due to water causing further problems, when the base layer was damaged as a result of a rapid freeze and thaw cycle.

The bypass has undergone two separate lane-widening schemes during its existence, first in 1966 when it was widened to three lanes, then in the 1990s to expand it to four lanes in each direction. The latter upgrade was significant enough to require reconstruction of the entire route including all bridges and it is now effectively a different motorway from the one that opened in 1958.

History

Planning
Before the motorway was constructed, the A6 through Preston handled north-south traffic with tailbacks and congestion a common occurrence, more so during special occasions such as the Blackpool Illuminations. The route had been planned as far back as 1937–1938, with the basic alignment still deemed feasible by the time Lancashire County Council gave approval in the mid 1940s. Chief engineer Drake was part of a delegation from Lancashire that travelled to Germany in 1938 in order that a plan could be drawn up by the council. The agreed route formed part of the County Surveyors' Society's national proposals and was protected by Lancashire County Council from any future developments. During planning, the legal powers necessary for motorway construction did not exist, until the introduction of the Special Roads Act in 1949 that made it lawful to construct roads that were to be used only by certain classes of vehicle. The bypass was seen as an experiment for future motorway construction, with many lessons and techniques being learnt that would contribute to the success of future projects. When the proposals were made public, including a large-scale model to ease the explaining of the scheme, only a handful of formal objections were raised and were resolved by agreement without the need to initiate a public inquiry, cited in part because of close personal involvement of Lancashire County Council and the surveyor during consultation.

The Tarmac Group won the construction bid in 1956, including 19 bridges; John Cox was the onsite engineer assigned by the contractor to oversee the construction.

Construction

The road was originally built with two lanes in each direction, but with an unusually wide central reservation to accommodate a third lane to be added each way at a later date. The work was a compromise between the Ministry of Transport and Drake, the latter thinking that two lanes would not be adequate. Initially, the shoulders were hardened with gravel but not paved, a fact still reflected in the British term hard shoulder. A hedge was planted along the length of the central reservation to help reduce dazzle from the headlights of oncoming traffic at night. The road was constructed not to be a long stretch of straight road and with the addition of various bridges and tree planting, in the hope to prevent driver boredom reported on foreign motorways. During the early months, some of the land was not available for contractors, as there were 75 agreements in place with land owners, with some, such as farmers, having clauses allowing them to complete that year's harvest prior to construction work commencing.

The earth material used for the embankments was planned to come from the road foundation works, but rainfall meant it was no longer fit for purpose, so hundreds of thousands of tons of hard filling was imported from around Lancashire. Earth-moving works could only be done efficiently through March to June, while conditions from July to October would be too sodden and not possible at all during winter. In total,  of earth was excavated, with a further  of material imported for filling. A newly discovered and unexpected bog in the Ribble valley also required removal. A total of 22 bridges were required in construction, and designers were given relative freedom in planning them. Chief engineer Drake proposed the bridges be painted different colours to enhance aesthetics and help alleviate driver boredom, contrary to conventional practice of using neutral colours; drivers subsequently reacted favourably to alternately coloured bridges.

The contracted period for construction was planned to be around two years, but the timescale was lengthened by nearly 25% due to rainfall that persisted throughout much of the early construction period. The heavy rainfall in late 1956 had profound effects on the heavy engineering works required to construct the road foundation, resulting in this aspect of work being postponed until early 1957. During the first nine months of construction, working conditions were so bad that the main contractor, Tarmac Ltd, had an extension of five months granted due to the extraordinary and unforeseen weather conditions, pushing the date of completion back to 30 November 1958. At its peak, 750 men and around 24 engineers were working on the road's construction, as well as 50 crawler tractors, 24 excavators, 12 dump trucks and around 100 lorries.

Numerous lessons were learnt from the construction of Britain's first motorway, particularly towards using an appropriately screened base material, with water drainage systems that should be appropriate and fit for purposes, as well as the inclusion of continuous hard shoulders.

Opening

The bypass was opened on 5 December 1958 by the Prime Minister, Harold Macmillan. It had cost £2,960,481, of which almost £2.5m was for construction of the motorway itself and over £500,000 was for the construction of two required major bridges, those being the Samlesbury Bridge (£334,431) and the High Walton Bridge (£193,690) respectively. It was estimated that around a third of a total cost was on the bridges alone, a point questioned by the Birmingham Post, who noted that in percentage terms, it would not have cost significantly more to build the motorway as three lanes, compared to doing so retrospectively in the years to follow.

Macmillan became the first man in Britain to travel on a motorway, as a passenger in an Austin Sheerline limousine, setting off from what is now junction 31 on the M6 motorway. Many hundreds of people gathered at the interchange in Samlesbury to witness the official opening, of whom many had participated in the construction and were proud of what they had achieved.

Operation

Lancashire Police estimated that 2,300 cars were using the road each day within the first month of opening, which was considerably less than the road's capacity. The Coventry Evening Telegraph suggested in the first weeks after opening that the motorway was losing several hundred pounds a day, factoring in the lower than expected usage compared against the construction cost. Initially, the motorway was taking over 1,500 cars an hour, mostly sightseers driving for the experience, however large queues at the northern roundabout terminus resulted in considerable lost journey time on a road that was intended to significantly reduce journey times.

Shortly after opening, the motorway saw its first two minor incidents; each was as a result of inexperienced drivers (in one case, an underage driver) being unfamiliar with motorway driving and losing control of their vehicles.

On 21 January 1959, just 46 days after opening, the motorway had to close temporarily to undergo emergency resurfacing work, as water had drained into the hard shoulder and seeped into the base layer. This subsequently suffered as a result of frost weathering, resulting in crumbling road parts affecting approximately 1% of the surface. The cost of repairs was around £5,000, as quoted by then-Minister of Transport and Civil Aviation Harold Watkinson; additional drainage systems were also installed alongside the carriageway at a cost of £90,000.

Upgrades
An additional third lane was added in each direction in 1966 using the land reserved within the central reservation, without the need to modify existing bridges. Despite the relative ease in this work, the lack of hard shoulders at the bridges meant the number of available lanes during engineering works was inadequate to cope with the traffic volumes of the time, estimated to have been in the region of 140,000 vehicles daily. Construction of the M61 motorway in 1969–1970 to carry Manchester traffic northbound had its northern terminus connect to a new junction on the bypass at Bamber Bridge, requiring the construction of Blacow Bridge to carry the north-bound M61 traffic over the M6.

The bypass underwent significant work during the early 1990s, when it was completely rebuilt to become four lanes in each direction. All of the bridges needed removing so a hard shoulder could be provided, despite most of them having a design lifespan of 120 years. The bid to undertake the work was awarded to Balfour Beatty in February 1993, at a cost of £37,458,986. The upgrade meant that the bypass was entirely reconstructed and is now effectively a different motorway to the original bypass. The four-lane motorway had been initially proposed back in 1924, when the idea was quickly dismissed after pressure mounted from railway lobbyists.

Route

Despite the motorway passing through industrial areas, the proposed route alignment meant that property demolition was kept to a minimum, with just a single farmhouse and three dwellings requiring demolition. The route was constructed through four separate localities, including  through the County Borough of Preston,  through the Urban District of Walton-le-Dale,  through the Urban District of Fulwood and  through the Rural District of Preston.

Initially, there were a total of 22 bridges built under or over the motorway, such as a principal bridge at Samlesbury which carried traffic over the River Ribble and the A59 trunk road, the only junction upon opening; the other principal bridge was at Higher Walton, carrying traffic over the River Darwen and the A675 road.

The routes around the city of Preston, including the bypass as part of the modern day M6 motorway, are recognised as being some of the most congested in the UK, with traffic to and from Preston being labelled amongst the country’s top 25 most congested routes.

See also
 List of motorways in the United Kingdom

References

External links

 Today in History – Motorway drivers put their foot down

Bypasses
M6 motorway
Transport in the City of Preston
Roads in Lancashire
Transport infrastructure completed in 1958
1958 establishments in England